Tristram Chockley Coffin (August 13, 1909 – March 26, 1990) was a former film and television actor from the latter 1930s through the 1970s, usually in westerns or other B-movie action-adventure productions.

Early years
Coffin's mother was actress Elizabeth Christie, and his uncle was writer Robert P. T. Coffin.

Career 
In 1940, Coffin appeared as Phillips in Chasing Trouble, a comedy espionage film. He is perhaps best known for his role as Jeff King in Republic Pictures' King of the Rocket Men (1949), the first of three serials starring the "Rocket Man" character. During the 1940s and into the early 1950s, Coffin appeared in other movie serials, including Dick Tracy's G-Men (1939), Jesse James Rides Again (1947), Bruce Gentry (1949), Pirates of the High Seas (1950), Mysterious Dr. Satan (1940), Sky Raiders (1941), Holt of the Secret Service (1941), Perils of Nyoka (1942), Federal Agents vs. the Underworld (1949), and Radar Patrol vs. Spy King (1950).

In 1955, he joined Peter Graves, William Schallert, and Tyler McVey in the episode "The Man Who Tore Down the Wall" of NBC's Hallmark Hall of Fame. He had guest-starred in the series Adventures of Superman, sometimes playing a "good guy", sometimes a "bad guy". In 1954 he appeared as Principal Garwood in Stamp Day for Superman, which was produced by Superman, Inc. for The United States Department of the Treasury to promote the purchase of U.S. Savings Bonds.

Coffin also had a role in the very first TV episode of The Lone Ranger, as Captain Dan Reid of the Texas Rangers, the older brother of the man who would become The Lone Ranger after his brother and four other comrades were murdered by outlaws; he also appeared in the "Cannonball McKay" (1949) episode (1/16) as Marshall Jim Hanley. He also appeared as a guest star in the ABC western series The Life and Legend of Wyatt Earp, starring Hugh O'Brian in the title role.

Coffin played the role of Col. Willis Murdock on the  ABC/Warner Brothers western series Colt .45 in the 1960 episode "The Cause". On February 9, 1960, Coffin appeared as Grey Gordon in "The 10 percent Blues" of the ABC/WB crime drama Bourbon Street Beat with Andrew Duggan, Richard Long, and Van Williams. He also guest-starred on the ABC/WB western series The Alaskans.

In an episode of Climax!, an adaptation of Raymond Chandler's The Long Goodbye, Coffin, playing a dead body, is said to have arisen during its live broadcast and walked off stage. The event was widely covered in the media of the day, later becoming an urban legend that was attributed to Peter Lorre in the Climax! series adaptation of Casino Royale. Coffin also appeared in another episode of Climax!, "Escape From Fear", in 1955.

He also appeared in comedies, including episodes of Father Knows Best, Hey, Jeannie!, I Love Lucy, Batman, and Walter Brennan's The Real McCoys.

Personal life 
Coffin married model Vera Duke, nee Veta Hetman, on January 6, 1948, in California.

Coffin died of lung cancer on March 26, 1990, in Santa Monica, California, at the age of 80. His ashes were scattered at sea.

Coffin was a Mormon.

Partial filmography
 Overland Mail (1939)
 West of Pinto Basin (1940)
 Hidden Enemy (1940)
 Forbidden Trails (1941)
 Roaring Frontiers (1941)
 Let's Go Collegiate (1941)
 Tonto Basin Outlaws (1941)
 The Corpse Vanishes (1942)
 Police Bullets (1942)
 The Crime Smasher (1943)
 Under Nevada Skies (1946)
 Swing the Western Way (1946)
 The Mysterious Mr. Valentine (1946)
 Rio Grande Raiders (1946)
 Louisiana (1947)
 Valley of Fear (1947)
 California Firebrand (1948)
 King of the Rocket Men (1949)
 Radar Secret Service (1950)
 Square Dance Katy (1950)
 Undercover Girl (1950)
 The Lady Pays Off (1951)
 According to Mrs. Hoyle (1951)
 Northwest Territory (1951)
 ‘’Adventures of Superman’’ (1951)
 Smoky Canyon (1952)
 The Kid from Broken Gun (1952)
 Fireman Save My Child (1954)
 Creature with the Atom Brain (1955)
 The Night the World Exploded (1957)
 The Silent Witness (1962)
 The Crawling Hand (1963)
 Iron Angel (1964)
 Good Neighbor Sam (1964)
 Zebra in the Kitchen (1965)
 The Barefoot Executive (1971)
 Night Call Nurses (1972)

References

External links

1909 births
1990 deaths
American male film actors
American male television actors
Male Western (genre) film actors
University of Washington alumni
Male actors from Greater Los Angeles
Male actors from Salt Lake City
People from Juab County, Utah
20th-century American male actors
Western (genre) television actors
Deaths from lung cancer in California
American Latter Day Saints